West Air Luxembourg was a subsidiary of FAST Logistics Luxembourg. The company was founded in 2002 by West Air Europe and operated mainly as an air feeder for express mail companies such as TNT, DHL, FedEx, and UPS. Prior to its sale and dissolution in 2014, the company operated a fleet of 15 BAe ATP and 1 ATR-72.

History

West Air Luxembourg was founded in 2002 by West Air Europe as a sister company to West Air Sweden both to avoid the increasing labor costs of its Swedish operations and to move closer to the operational and decision centers of most of its customers. Over time, most of the West Air Sweden fleet was transferred to the West Air Luxembourg AOC, but the principal activity remained providing feeder services to the major overnight express carriers.

In 2011, parent West Air Europe agreed to merge with Atlantic Airlines to form West Atlantic.

In October 2013, West Atlantic announced the sale of its West Air Luxembourg subsidiary to FAST Logistics Luxembourg. Before the sale, West Atlantic moved all but one aircraft in the West Air Luxembourg fleet to the AOC of West Air Sweden.

References

External links

Airlines of Luxembourg
Airlines established in 2001
Cargo airlines
Luxembourgian companies established in 2001
Swedish companies established in 1962